This is a list of genes, proteins or receptors named A1 or Alpha-1 :
 Actin, alpha 1
 Actinin, alpha 1
 Adaptor-related protein complex 2, alpha 1
 Aldehyde dehydrogenase 3 family, member A1
 Aldehyde dehydrogenase 4 family, member A1
 Aldehyde dehydrogenase 5 family, member A1
 Aldehyde dehydrogenase 6 family, member A1
 Aldehyde dehydrogenase 9 family, member A1
 Aldehyde dehydrogenase 18 family, member A1
 Aldo-keto reductase family 1, member A1
 Alpha-1-microglobulin/bikunin precursor
 Apolipoprotein A1 and ApoA-1 Milano
 ATPase, H+ transporting, lysosomal V0 subunit a1
 ATPase, Na+/K+ transporting, alpha 1
 ATP synthase, H+ transporting, mitochondrial F1 complex, alpha 1
 BCL2-related protein A1
 Butyrophilin, subfamily 1, member A1
 Butyrophilin, subfamily 3, member A1
 Capping protein (actin filament) muscle Z-line, alpha 1
 Carboxypeptidase A1
 Casein kinase 1, alpha 1
 Casein kinase 2, alpha 1
 Catenin (cadherin-associated protein), alpha 1
 Centaurin, alpha 1
 Cholinergic receptor, nicotinic, alpha 1
 Coagulation factor XIII, A1 polypeptide
 collagen, type I, alpha 1
 collagen, type II, alpha 1
 Collagen, type III, alpha 1
 Collagen, type IV, alpha 1
 Collagen, type V, alpha 1
 Collagen, type VI, alpha 1
 Collagen, type VII, alpha 1
 Collagen, type VIII, alpha 1
 Collagen, type IX, alpha 1
 Collagen, type X, alpha 1
 Collagen, type XI, alpha 1
 Collagen, type XII, alpha 1
 Collagen, type XIII, alpha 1
 Collagen, type XIV, alpha 1
 Collagen, type XV, alpha 1
 Collagen, type XVI, alpha 1
 Collagen, type XVII, alpha 1
 Collagen, type XVIII, alpha 1
 Collagen, type XIX, alpha 1
 Collagen, type XXV, alpha 1
 Collagen, type XXVII, alpha 1
 Crystallin, beta A1
 Cyclic nucleotide-gated channel alpha 1
 Cyclin A1
 Cytochrome P450, family 1, member A1
 Defensin, alpha 1
 Dystrophin-associated protein A1
 Ephrin A1
 Eukaryotic translation elongation factor 1 alpha 1
 Family with sequence similarity 13, member A1
 Family with sequence similarity 19 (chemokine (C-C motif)-like), member A1
 Gamma-aminobutyric acid (GABA) A receptor, alpha 1
 Gap junction protein, alpha 1
 GDNF family receptor alpha 1
 Glutathione S-transferase A1
 Glycine receptor, alpha 1
 Heat shock protein 90kDa alpha (cytosolic), member A1
 Hemoglobin, alpha 1
 Heterogeneous nuclear ribonucleoprotein A1
 Homeobox A1
 Immunoglobulin heavy constant alpha 1
 Importin alpha 1
 Interferon, alpha 1
 Interleukin 13 receptor, alpha 1
 Karyopherin alpha 1
 Laminin, alpha 1
 Major histocompatibility complex, class II, DP alpha 1
 Major histocompatibility complex, class II, DQ alpha 1
 Myosin light chain A1, an actin-binding protein
 NADH dehydrogenase (ubiquinone), alpha 1
 Nucleolar protein, member A1
 PCDHA4
 Phospholipase A1
 Phosphorylase kinase, alpha 1
 Plexin A1
 Polymerase (DNA directed), alpha 1
 Potassium large conductance calcium-activated channel, subfamily M, alpha 1
 Proteasome (prosome, macropain) subunit, alpha 1
 Protein kinase, AMP-activated, alpha 1
 Protein tyrosine phosphatase, receptor type, f polypeptide (PTPRF), interacting protein (liprin), alpha 1
 Protocadherin alpha 1
 Pulmonary surfactant-associated protein A1
 Pyruvate dehydrogenase (lipoamide) alpha 1
 RNA binding motif protein, Y-linked, family 1, member A1
 Replication protein A1
 S100 calcium binding protein A1
 Sec61 alpha 1
 Serum amyloid A1
 Solute carrier family 35 (CMP-sialic acid transporter), member A1
 Spectrin, alpha 1
 Sperm protein associated with the nucleus, X-linked, family member A1
 Syntrophin, alpha 1
 Transient receptor potential cation channel, member A1
 UDP glucuronosyltransferase 1 family, polypeptide A1
 Urea Transporter A1
 a gene found in the maize encoding for the dihydroflavonol 4-reductase (reducing dihydroflavonols into flavan-4-ols) in the phlobaphene metabolic pathway

 proteins 
 α-1-antitrypsin, an acute-phase protein in the Alpha 1-antitrypsin deficiency, a genetic disorder
 Annexin A1, a human protein
 Outer membrane phospholipase A1, a bacterial protein

 receptors 
 α-1-Adrenoceptor, an adrenergic receptor with the primary effect of vasoconstriction
 Alpha-1 blocker, a variety of drugs which block α1-adrenergic receptors in arteries and smooth muscles
 Adenosine A1 receptor
 EPH receptor A1
 A1, a subfamily of rhodopsin-like receptors
 SR-A1, a type of scavenger receptors

 domains 
 CTA1, a portion of the cholera toxin chain

 alleles 
 A1, an allele in the DRD2 TaqI polymorphism that could be involved in alcoholism

Receptor
Molecular-biology-related lists